Serenade is a novel by James M. Cain published in 1938 by Alfred A. Knopf. and one of four Cain novels to feature opera as a plot device.

Loosely based on Bizet's Carmen, the story explores the sources of artistic development, in particular the role played by sexual orientation in the development of artistic talent.

Regarded as one of his most significant works, Serenade has been called "Cain's finest sustained piece of writing."

Plot Summary 

A successful American opera singer, John Howard Sharp, is down-and-out in Tupinamba, Mexico. Formerly a fine baritone well-known in Europe, he inexplicably loses his formerly powerful voice. At a café he encounters the attractive Indio prostitute, Juana Montes. Sharp is attracted to her and wins her from a local bullfighter, Triesca. She takes Sharp to a brothel. When he sings excerpts from Bizet's Carmen, Juana's interest in him cools: she detects something unmanly in his performance. Sharp and Juana part ways, and he continues his penurious existence.
 
Months later Juana wins 500 pesos and a new Ford roadster in a lottery.  She plans to open a cafe-bordello in Acapulco catering to American tourists under the auspices of a local politico-military kingpin. She enlists Sharp to be bartender, bouncer and bookkeeper for the establishment, in part because she suspects that he is sexually ambivalent and will not molest the female employees. 
 
En route to Acapulco in the roadster, they make a detour over remote country roads to pick up food supplies from Juana's parents. As night falls, a storm breaks over the couple and the vehicle becomes trapped by flood waters. They discover a remote, unoccupied Catholic church, and Sharp crashes the vehicle through its locked double doors to find shelter from the rain. He parks the car in front of the altar. Soaking wet, Sharp exchanges his clothing for a priest's cassock and pilfers candles from the Sacristy for utility lighting. Juana is appalled and paralyzed at the sacrilege. Sharp makes a charcoal fire on the floor tiles of the vestry and prepares a meal from their provisions. Juana joins him and they become intoxicated on sacramental wine. Superstitious, she becomes hysterical at hearing peals of thunder. Sharp attempts to calm her by playing the organ and singing the Nona Nobis as the storm rages. Juana disparages his performance as that of a celibate monk. Juana disrobes and makes an "Aztec" offering before the altar. Sharp rapes her on the alter.
 
Unable to depart due to the flooding, they spend a second day at the church. Juana catches an iguana and ritualistically, they prepare it for a meal. The iguana meat acts as an aphrodisiac and they make love. Sharp sings and Juana assures him that he has been restored to his former vocal prowess. Sharp falls in love with Juana.

They arrive in Acapulco and register at a seedy hotel. Sharp is determined to return to the United States to resume his operatic career. He arranges passage for himself and Juana on the steamer Port of Cobh, operated by the irascible Irishman Captain Conners. At the hotel, the Mexican kingpin, surrounded by his federal goons, demands sexual favors from Juana. Sharp intercedes and knocks the politico unconscious. The couple flee for their lives in the roadster. Conners intercepts the fugitives and clandestinely escorts them to the Port of Cobh and they embark for San Pedro, California. An aficionado of 19th Century symphonic forms, the captain welcomes Sharp's demonstration of his operatic skills. During the voyage, they hotly dispute the relative merits of the great classical composers. Upon arrival in San Pedro, Conners cunningly secrets the undocumented Juana past immigration officials. He pledges to assist the couple in the event of a crisis.
 
Sharp begins to explore the market for opera singers in Hollywood. Known primarily in European operatic circles, agents show little interest in him. He resorts to singing and playing guitar in nightclubs at $7.50 a night and at various venues for tips. 
Desperately low on money, Sharp and Juana attend an evening performance of Carmen at the Hollywood Bowl. During the first act, a singer is suddenly pulled from the stage. Though undetected by the audience, Sharp instantly recognizes that the baritone has become incapacitated. Familiar with the part, Sharp offers to fill in. The conductor, though skeptical, allows him to sing. Sharp's performance is a grand success. 
 
A film studio executive immediately signs him to a lucrative contract to sing in motion pictures. His debut film, a B-Western, is a critical and box office success. The studio is outraged when Sharp insists on $50,000 for his next feature, but they accept the terms on a three-picture contract.
 
His movie career ascendant, Sharp introduces Juana to Hollywood society at co-star Elsa Chadwick's celebrity party. Juana, dressed in florid Indio garments, is deemed gauche by the hostess and shunned by the female guests. Furious, Sharp declines to sing and prepares to leave with Juana.  Chadwick warns him to never again to bring his "cheap Mexican tart." Sharp slaps the actress in the face and leaves. Juana is perplexed, but unfazed by her rejection.
 
Deeply disillusioned with Hollywood. Sharp is cheered when his New York agent sends a telegram: the Metropolitan Opera wishes to put him under contract. After a protracted struggle with his agent and the studio executive Rex Gold, both of whom disparage opera, Sharp is emphatically denied a temporary release to perform with the Metropolitan. Defying  them, he bolts from Hollywood and travels to New York to sing. Sharp performs in all the standard repertoire that season, to great acclaim.
 
The movie studio initiates litigation against Sharp for breach of contract. The Metropolitan's own attorney declines to defend Sharp for fear of exposing the company to lawsuits. Sharp is urged to comply with his Hollywood obligations, or cease singing with the company. The crisis is at an impasse when Sharp receives a phone call, a call which Juana, preternaturally,  urges him not to answer; the caller is Winston Hawes. 
 
Hawes is both a conductor of tremendous talent and a superb music teacher who had mentored the young Sharp in Paris. He is also an entrepreneur who regards music as a commodity to be exploited: "he made a whore out of it." Sharp had fallen under Hawes' spell as the price of developing his operatic skills long dash a spell that tempted Sharp to satisfy Hawes' desire for a sexual relationship. When Sharp realized that his dependency on Hawes had become a humiliating addiction, the quality of his voice deteriorated and he ceased to be a topnotch baritone. He escaped to Mexico, where opera companies were deemed less discriminating artistically. There he encountered Juana Montez and recovered his singing prowess under her influence.
 
Hawes is conducting opera in New York and informs Sharp that he has already booked him for a performance. When Sharp demurs due to his Hollywood obligations, Hawes insists he come immediately to his hotel suite to resolve the matter. Sharp is loath to comply with the domineering "Papa" Hawes, but Juana encourages him to go. 
Hawes is a scion of a powerful banking family with large financial investments in Hollywood. Sharp suddenly suspects, and Hawes confesses,  that he has been monitoring Sharp's activities in Mexico and personally engineered Sharp's movie career. Studio executive Rex Gold is Hawes' tool, used in an elaborate "sham" to maneuver Sharp into performing opera in New York - under Hawe's auspices. Sharp participates in a number of radio nationwide broadcasts that are heard by Captain Conners. He sends Sharp a radiogram to congratulate him and he sails to New York.
 
During an elaborately organized production of Damrosch's Mandalay conducted by Hawes, Sharp performs beautifully until a moment in an encore, in which he momentarily reverts to his "priest"-like voice. Juana, who is in the audience, detects the lapse. After the show she confronts Sharp on the nature of his relationship with Hawes, accusing them of being lovers. Shamed, Sharp confesses to Juana his former homosexual desires, and begs Juana to not abandon him. They make passionate love for two days, exorcising Hawes.
Hawes continues to pursue Sharp, taking a suite down the hall from the couple's hotel room.  When introduced, Juana and Hawes preserve good manners, concealing their venomous hostility for one another. Hawes' persistent and unannounced visits to their apartment unnerves Sharp. Nevertheless, the couple accepts an invitation to his housewarming party. Juana arrives sporting an authentic bullfighter's cape. Most of the guests are cross-dressed for the jazz-themed gathering. Juana and Hawes engage in an elaborate and comic pantomime of a bullfight, Juana playing the toreador and Hawes playing the bull.

During the entertainment, Sharp is alerted by a bellboy that an immigration agent is on the premises to arrest Juana Montez. The bellboy offers to secretly get her out of the hotel. Sharp realizes that Hawes had tipped off the agent, and urges Juana to escape. She leaves the suite only to return with a genuine espada.  Juana, Hawes and some drunken guests enact a mock bullfight and Juana impales Hawes with her sword, killing him and spitting on his bleeding body. Though horrified, Sharp secretly rejoices. The guests flee in panic and Juana disappears.

The police interrogate Sharp and consider framing him with violating the Mann Act. He pleads ignorance and is held briefly as a material witness, submits a bond and is released on bail. The police place Sharp under heavy surveillance hoping he will lead them to Juana. Captain Conners phones Sharp and they communicate on an untapped phone: Juana has located Conners and is safely in port aboard the Port of Cobh. Sharp cleverly evades the numerous agents who are tailing him. Reunited with Juana, she tells Sharp she must flee alone, but he insists on joining her. Conners cautions him that in his company she is "doomed." Sharp and Juana begin a life as fugitives from the law and they settle in Guatemala to live in exile. His image, widely seen on movie lobby cards, compels Sharp to make cosmetic changes to conceal his appearance. He studies Spanish so as not to speak English with Juana in public. Juana recognizes that she and Sharp are deteriorating together in isolation. Juana urges him emphatically to leave her. They draw apart and cease sleeping together.
 
Sharp struggles with his sexual identity and visits a brothel to reaffirm his heterosexuality. He is tormented by nightmares. Juana begins to work as a prostitute at the same brothel that Sharp frequents and taunts him with the fact. Sharp assaults her and she flees from their home. Hopelessly dependent upon Juana, Sharp pursues her in desperation. He finally discovers she has taken an airplane to Mexico City. Sharp follows, and spots her at a cafe in the company of Triesca, the bullfighter. Triesca mocks Sharp by imitating an opera singer in falsetto. Sharp retaliates with a powerful and moving rendition of Cielito Lindo directed toward Juana. The cafe patrons react with wild applause. 
Unwittingly, Sharp's impressive performance instantly reveals his identity to the authorities. The Acapulco political-military kingpin appears, and vengefully guns down Juana. Sharp escapes punishment due to his celebrity status, but realizes he has been instrumental in the death of the woman he loves.

Sharp transports Juana's coffin to the rural church where he had fallen in love with her. Racked by guilt, Sharp declines the priest's request that he sing at the sacrament: "Never again" he declares.

Publication History

Shortly after selling his story "Two Can Sing" to Liberty magazine in 1936, Cain took the proceeds and traveled to Mexico and Guatemala to collect material for a novel whose working title was Sombra y Sol ("Shadow and Sun"). The story that emerged is "the most controversial" of Cain's work.
 
Exploring Guatemala City, Cain encountered a prostitute upon whose physical attractiveness and dignified manners—"a perfect dame"—he would base the character Juana (a diminutive of the Spanish word iguana according to Cain). He also surveyed the region around Acapulco, Mexico, locating a small rural church that matched his literary image where he would set his "infamous" love scene. He consulted meteorologists to confirm that the vicinity experienced torrential rains that could strand his protagonists.

Cain examined an Indio dwelling to gain insights into the culture of indigenous people, providing him with "the general theme of the book, which was the triumph of a primitive Mexican girl who was wise—though ignorant—over the complicated, apparently civilized world of the other characters."

Serenade was completed in July 1937, and publisher Alfred A. Knopf Sr., describing the work as "magnificent", rushed it into print by December of that year.

Critical Analysis

Characterizations of hetero- and homosexuality

Serenade provoked an intense controversy when it appeared in 1938 over his treatment of the "sensational" topic of homosexuality and creativity. Condemned by the Catholic Church, the book elicited approval by those medical professionals consulted by Cain. This element of Cain's plot conceit was in his day "startling subject matter." According to biographer and literary critic Roy Hoopes, the central theme of the book is "the conflict in Sharp between his latent homosexuality and his [heterosexual] love for Juana, and the impact of this struggle on his voice." When Cain consulted medical professionals concerning his plot conceit—that homosexual singers were artistically handicapped—he was reassured by his contemporaries that it had legitimacy. He proceeded to develop the story on this pseudo-scientific premise. Biographer Paul Skenazy writes: 

Skenazy adds that "the success of the book seems a result of Cain's complete investment of the preposterous assumptions that underlie the action."

Disparaging portrayals of homosexuals were not uncommon among Cain's literary colleagues, among them Ernest Hemingway, Dashiell Hammett and Raymond Chandler.

The "church scene"

The scene in Serenade that contributed to the book's notoriety is the action that occurs in a small, rural Catholic church, which includes a brutal sexual encounter between Sharp and Juana on the alter.

As Sharp drives further from civilization, arriving at a remote rural Catholic Church in search of shelter, Juana progressively sheds the trapping of the city and reverts to her Indio roots.
After forcibly entering the church, Sharp, who served as a Catholic choirboy in his youth, continues to genuflect as he passes the altar which is now illuminated by the headlights of the parked roadster. Disrobed and fearing retribution, Juana prepares an "Aztec" offering of poultry eggs and corn to placate her deity. Sharp completes his sacrilege by raping Juana. Paul Skenazy writes:

 

When the couple prepare an iguana for a meal "Sharp smears [Juana's] nipples with Iguana grease" and feeds upon her breasts, reviving Sharp's manhood and his ability to achieve his former talents as a singer.

The Mock Bullfight scene

Cain presents a contest set in a posh New York City apartment pitting Juana against Sharp's nemesis, Winston Hawes.

The contestants represent two diametrically opposed and irreconcilable social and cultural outlooks: Hawes, that of "cosmopolitanism, wealth, exploitative power, and sexual abnormality" and Juana, that of a "prehistoric" and "primitive" world that is guided by intuition, instinct, and preternatural power derived from nature. Paul Skenazy notes that "The battle between Juana and Hawes for Sharp's soul is not only a battle of homo- and heterosexuality, but between two radically different sets of artistic and ethical principles, and between modern and primitive worlds."

Sharp's sexual ambivalence is revealed when Juana must act as his champion to destroy the threat to her lover's manhood. In murdering Hawes, Juana sets in motion events that lead to her own death: a death that in turn destroys Sharp's ability to sing. Author and literary critic Joyce Carol Oates writes:

Paul Skenazy offers this analysis:

Adaptations of Serenade

Several studios expressed interest in obtaining the film rights to Serenade upon its publication, including Metro-Goldwyn-Mayer and Columbia Pictures. Cain prepared a treatment that expunged the homosexual themes and shifted them to alcoholism so as to make it acceptable to the Hays Office. In 1944, Warner Brothers studios paid $35,000 for the rights, considering Humphrey Bogart for the role of John Howard Sharp.  Cain, who had sold the rights of seven of his books to Hollywood since 1933, was skeptical about the adaptability of the Serenade to film. Biographer Roy Hoopes reports that "Cain always maintained that Serenade was almost impossible to produce as either a movie or a stage play." Cain declined a request by Oscar Hammerstein II to develop Serenade as a musical.

In 1956 Warner Bros. released a "pale version" of under the same title, starring Mario Lanza, Joan Fontaine and Vincent Price. Biographer David Madden judged Cain's novel "incredibly mutilated" by the studio.
In 1948, composer Leonard Bernstein attempted to enlist Cain's participation in making a "grand opera" based on the novel. Cain supported the project, but declined to write the libretto. Berstein and associates obtained an option on Serenade to make a musical. After years of negotiations with Cain's agent, Bernstein shifted his attention to the production of West Side Story.

Footnotes

Sources 
Cain, James M. 1989. Three by Cain: Serenade, Love’s Lovely Counterfeit, The Butterfly. Vintage Books. New York. 
Hoopes, Roy. 1981. The Baby in the Icebox and Other Short Fiction by James M. Cain. Holt, Rinehart & Winston. New York. 
Hoopes, Roy. 1982. Cain. Holt, Reinhart and Winston. New York. 
Hoopes, Roy. 1986. Career in C Major and Other Fiction. McGraw-Hill Book Company. New York. 
Madden, David. 1970. James M. Cain. Twayne Publishers, Inc. Library Catalog Card Number: 78-120011.
Skenazy, Paul. 1989. James M. Cain. Continuum Publishing Company. New York. 

1937 American novels
Novels about music
1930s LGBT novels
Alfred A. Knopf books
American novels adapted into films
Novels by James M. Cain
Novels set in Mexico
Novels set in California